The 2002–03 Japan Ice Hockey League season was the 37th season of the Japan Ice Hockey League. Five teams participated in the league, and Kokudo Ice Hockey Club won the championship.

Regular season

Playoffs

First round
 Nippon Paper Cranes - Kokudo Ice Hockey Club 1:3/3:2

Second round
 Oji Seishi Hockey - Kokudo Ice Hockey Club 3:5/3:3

Final
 Seibu Tetsudo - Kokudo Ice Hockey Club 2:3 (2:4, 4:2, 2:3, 2:1, 0:4)

External links
 Season on hockeyarchives.info

Japan
Japan Ice Hockey League seasons
Japan
Japan